Tyler Jamal Brown (born May 31, 1995), known professionally as Tyla Yaweh, is an American rapper and singer. He is currently signed to Epic Records and London Entertainment.

Early life 
Tyler Jamal Brown was born on May 31, 1995, in Orlando, Florida. He grew up in Orlando, in a rough neighborhood, and was quoted saying, "I’ve been on my own since I was 14. I saw the streets, I saw everything that came out of Orlando... it taught me life." He initially supported himself by working at a local Dunkin' Donuts until he was evicted by his mother for criminal behavior.

Career 
After arriving in Los Angeles, California, he was discovered by Post Malone and his manager Dre London, who went on to sign him to their record label London Entertainment, in conjunction with Epic Records.

Yaweh's single "Drugs and Pain" was released on November 22, 2017, and was followed by the singles "Wildlife", "Gemini", and "Goals", the latter featuring Preme, all released throughout 2018. All three tracks performed well, achieving millions of streams across Spotify, YouTube, and SoundCloud.  He then released another single entitled "She Bad" in October 2018.

Yaweh released his debut mixtape Heart Full of Rage on February 22, 2019. After the Runaway Tour began on September 14, 2019, Yaweh released a single with YG called "I Think I Luv Her" on September 27, 2019.  He released a remix of the song "High Right Now" on January 24, 2020, that featured Wiz Khalifa with a music video that included appearances by Post Malone, Billie Joe Armstrong, and Big Sean.  He has also performed at festivals such as SXSW, Rolling Loud, and Made in America as well as touring Australia and Europe. He toured with Post Malone and Swae Lee on the Runaway Tour for both legs during fall 2019 and winter 2020, until the tour was halted near the end of the second leg due to the COVID-19 pandemic. Yaweh confirmed a second album is due to be released sometime in early 2021.

On June 12, 2020, Yaweh released the lead single, "Tommy Lee", which features Post Malone, for his second album, Rager Boy. The track was released on all digital platforms and was followed soon after with an accompanying music video. It became Yaweh's first career Hot 100 entry, debuting at number 65. The track was followed up with a remix, released July 10, 2020, featuring drums from Tommy Lee himself, as well as a re-recorded guitar instrumental.  A second remix featuring Saint Jhn was released subsequently.

Yaweh was joined by DaBaby on the track "Stuntin' on You", released on July 17, 2020. They both appear in its accompanying music video.  The song was later remixed with verses by DDG and Dame D.O.L.L.A. and is walk up song for MLB outfielder Mookie Betts. New single entitled "All the Smoke" was released by Yaweh, with appearances by Gunna and Wiz Khalifa.

On May 14, 2021, Yaweh featured on South Korean rapper B.I's single "Got It Like That" which also features American singer Destiny Rogers.

Discography

Studio albums

Singles

Notes

References 

1995 births
Rappers from Florida
Musicians from Orlando, Florida
Living people
Epic Records artists
Pop rappers
Southern hip hop musicians